The Animal Health and Welfare (Scotland) Act 2006 (asp 11) is an Act of the Scottish Parliament. It received Royal Assent on 11 July 2006.

The act consolidated, repealed and replaced many other pieces of legislation, such as the Protection of Animals Act 1934 and the Abandonment of Animals Act 1960.

The act bans tail docking of dogs. It exempts the docking of lambs' or pigs' tails, ear tagging and the castration of farm animals. The issue has caused controversy. The act also provided for increased slaughter powers in order to combat disease.

It also bans the act of removing the scent glands from skunks.

The corresponding act for England and Wales is the Animal Welfare Act 2006.

See also 
 Animal welfare in the United Kingdom

References

External links

Acts of the Scottish Parliament 2006
Animal welfare and rights legislation in the United Kingdom
Animal health in Scotland